Roberto Alarcón Sáez (born 21 April 1998) is a Spanish footballer who plays as a defender for Cavalry FC in the Canadian Premier League.

Career
Alarcón began his senior career with RCD Mallorca B of the Tercera División. In January 2018, he went on loan to CF Platges de Calvià. He made his debut for Mallorca on 18 August 2018 against Poblense. 
He would go on to score five goals in his first season with the club, the first of which was scored on 27 October 2018 as Mallorca lost 3-2 to Platges de Calvià.

In January 2020, Alarcón signed with FC Tucson of USL League One. He made his league debut for the club on 25 July 2020, playing the entirety of a 2-1 away victory over Fort Lauderdale CF. He scored his first goal on August 18 against Orlando City B. In December, FC Tucson exercised their club option on Alarcón, however, prior to the season, he mutually agreed to terminate his contract at the club.

In September 2021, he signed with Romanian club Universitatea Cluj in Liga II. He had initially been set to join FC Brașov, however, upper management of the club decided not to sign him after he impressed in his trial. He made nine appearances for the club as they earned promotion to the top tier for the following season. In June 2022, he was released by the club. 

In July 2022, he signed a contract with Canadian Premier League club Cavalry FC. In December 2022, Cavalry announced that Alarcón would be returning for the 2023 season, and that his contract had a club option for 2024.

References

External links

1998 births
Living people
Footballers from Palma de Mallorca
RCD Mallorca B players
FC Tucson players
Tercera División players
USL League One players
Liga II players
FC Universitatea Cluj players
Spanish footballers
Association football defenders
Spanish expatriate footballers
Expatriate soccer players in the United States
Spanish expatriate sportspeople in the United States
Expatriate footballers in Romania
Spanish expatriate sportspeople in Romania
Cavalry FC players
Canadian Premier League players